Lanosterol is a tetracyclic triterpenoid and is the compound from which all animal and fungal steroids are derived. By contrast plant steroids are produced via cycloartenol.

Role in biosynthesis of other steroids
Elaboration of lanosterol under enzyme catalysis leads to the core structure of steroids. 14-Demethylation of lanosterol by CYP51 eventually yields cholesterol.

Biosynthesis

Research
Lanosterol has been identified as a key component in maintaining eye lens clarity. Pre-clinical research has identified Lanosterol as a possible agent for the reversal and prevention of cataracts. In vivo experiments on dogs showed significant reversal of cataracts within 6 weeks of lanosterol injection. In 2018, Lanosterol was shown to improve lens clarity in cells with lens clouding due to aging or physical stressors. A subsequent study found positive results on the optics of the lens in mice with cataracts (Wang, Hoshino,Uesugi, Yagi, Pierscionek and Andley (2022).

Use
Lanosterol is an ingredient in over-the-counter ophthalmic products to prevent cataracts.  However, the solubility and bioavailability of lanosterol is not conducive to aqueous formulations.  Heliostatix Biotechnology claims to have a method of solubilizing lanosterol for use in aqueous products.

See also
Cycloartenol
CYP51

References

Further reading
 

Wang K, Hoshino M, Uesugi K, Yagi N, Pierscionek BK, Andley,UP. Oxysterol Compounds in mouse mutant αA- and αB-crystallin lenses can improve the optical properties of the lens. Investigative Ophthalmology and Visual Science, 63  doi:https://doi.org/10.1167/iovs.63.5.15 (2022)

External links

Sterols
Triterpenes
Lanostanes